Agrilus ruficollis, the red-necked cane borer, is a species of metallic wood-boring beetle in the  family Buprestidae. It is found in Europe and Northern Asia (excluding China) and North America.

References

Further reading

External links

 

rubrovittatus
Beetles described in 1787